Rapid City, Pierre and Eastern Railroad  is a Class II freight railroad operating across South Dakota and southern Minnesota in the northern plains of the United States. Portions of the railroad also extend into Wyoming and Nebraska. It is owned and operated by Genesee & Wyoming. The primary commodities shipped are grain, clay, and cement. Operations began on June 1, 2014.

History 
The Genesee & Wyoming, a holding company of mostly shortline railroads, formed the Rapid City, Pierre and Eastern to acquire the western end of the former Dakota, Minnesota and Eastern Railroad (DM&E) rail line from the Canadian Pacific Railway (CPR). The RCPE and DM&E entered an agreement on January 2, 2014, wherein RCPE would acquire 670 miles of track and 219 miles of trackage rights from the DM&E.  The acquisition was completed on May 30, 2014, for $210 million. Most of its employees came over from the DM&E. Operations began on June 1, 2014.

The State of South Dakota partnered with the RCPE to enhance rail service and keep agricultural commodities moving to market. In 2021, the RCPE received state and federal funding totalling US$42 million to upgrade 163 miles of rail between Fort Pierre and Rapid City. This project updated that portion of the line with 136 pound continuous welded rail. This increased the weight capacity of rail cars from   263,000-pound  to 286,000-pound and the speed limit from 10 mph to a minimum of 25 mph.

Route 
The Rapid City, Pierre and Eastern owns  of track. The main line runs between Tracy, Minnesota, and Rapid City, South Dakota, with branches north to Colony, in Crook County, Wyoming, and south to Dakota Junction, Nebraska. Much of the main line from Tracy to Rapid City is paralleled by U.S. Route 14. The route travels the length of the state from the eastern border with Minnesota, to the western border with Wyoming, crossing the Missouri river at Pierre.
Huron Subdivision, Tracy to Huron, South Dakota - 136 miles
Pierre Subdivision, Huron to Pierre. - 118 miles
PRC Subdivision, Pierre to Rapid City - 170 miles
Black Hills Subdivision, Crawford to Colony/Dakota Junction (Formerly known as the Crawford Subdivision for DM&E)
There are three short branches as well:
 Blunt, South Dakota–Onida, South Dakota
 Huron, South Dakota–Yale, South Dakota (Owned by the State of South Dakota and operated by the RCPE, meets the BNSF at Yale from Watertown)
 Redfield, South Dakota–Mansfield, South Dakota (Accessed via trackage rights on the BNSF Mitchell - Wolsey - Aberdeen line)
There are interchanges with the BNSF Railway at Wolsey, South Dakota, Crawford, Nebraska, and Florence, Minnesota. The interchange with the Canadian Pacific is at Tracy, Minnesota.
The RCPE has trackage rights from Tracy to Mankato, Minnesota on the CPR, where there is an interchange with the Union Pacific Railroad. The RCPE also has trackage rights over the BNSF Railway between Yale, SD to Watertown, South Dakota, and Wolsey, South Dakota to Aberdeen, South Dakota.

Operations 
, customers on the line ship approximately 64,000 carloads annually of grain, bentonite clay, ethanol, fertilizer and other products.

See also 

 Dakota, Minnesota and Eastern Railroad

References

External links 

 Official site
 Diesel roster

Rapid City, Pierre and Eastern Railroad
2014 establishments in South Dakota
Minnesota railroads
Nebraska railroads
South Dakota railroads
Wyoming railroads
Railway companies established in 2014
Genesee & Wyoming